Jairo José Pinilla Téllez (born 21 August 1944) is a Colombian film director. Considered the father of terror, suspense and science fiction in Colombia, and colloquially nicknamed "the Colombian Ed Wood".

Biography 
Born in Cali in 1944, he moved to Bogotá with his family at the age of four. From an early age he was attracted to themes of death and fear. The first film he saw in a movie theatre was The Thief of Baghdad. Pinilla studied electronic engineering at the Universidad Industrial de Popayán and specialized in electromechanical computers in Mexico with the North American company Burroughs Enterprise. In his free time he visited the Churubusco studios where he met the stars of Mexican cinema in the 60's. He decided to return to Colombia and make films. His first short film "Que mago" was made with reversible Black and White film and without sound, where we find for the first time in Colombia special effects in a short film. After making this film Pinilla began to put his ideas into practice, writing and directing "Cita con la época". A co-production of Asofilms and San Pablo Films, the short film was awarded a prize in Milan, Italy.

Selected filmography

References 

1944 births
Living people
Colombian film directors
People from Cali

es:Jairo José Pinilla Téllez